In combustion, a Burke–Schumann flame is a type of diffusion flame, established at the mouth of the two concentric ducts, by issuing fuel and oxidizer from the two region respectively. It is named after S.P. Burke and T.E.W. Schumann, who were able to predict the flame height and flame shape using their simple analysis of infinitely fast chemistry (which is now called as Burke–Schumann limit) in 1928 at the First symposium on combustion.

Mathematical description
Oxidizer is fed along the same axis, but in the concentric tube of radius  outside the fuel tube. Let the mass fraction in the fuel tube be  and the mass fraction of the oxygen in the outside duct be . Fuel and oxygen mixing occurs in the region . The following assumptions were made in the analysis:
 The average velocity is parallel to axis ( direction) of the ducts, 
The mass flux in the axial direction is constant, 
Axial diffusion is negligible compared to the transverse/radial diffusion
 The flame occurs infinitely fast (Burke–Schumann limit), therefore flame appears as a reaction sheet across which properties of flow changes
 Effects of gravity has been neglected

If  is the mass of fuel burned per unit volume per unit time and introducing the non-dimensional fuel and mass fraction and the Stoichiometry parameter,

the governing equations for fuel and oxidizer mass fraction reduce to

The boundary conditions for the problem are

The equation can be linearly combined to eliminate the non-linear reaction term  and solve for the new variable

,

where  is known as the mixture fraction. The mixture fraction takes the value of unity in the fuel stream and zero in the oxidizer stream and it is a scalar field which is not affected by the reaction.

Introducing the following coordinate transformation

reduces the equation to

The corresponding boundary conditions become

The equation can be solved by separation of variables

Flame shape and height
In the Burke-Schumann limit, the flame is considered as a thin reaction sheet outside which both fuel and oxygen cannot exist together, i.e., . The reaction sheet itself is located by the stoichiometric surface where , in other words, where

where  is the stoichiometric mixture fraction. The reaction sheet separates fuel and oxidizer region. The inner structure of the reaction sheet is described by Liñán's equation. On the fuel side of the reaction sheet

 

and on the oxidizer side

 

When , the flame extends from the mouth of the inner tube and attaches itself to the outer tube at a certain height (under-ventilated case) and when , the flame starts from the mouth of the inner tube and joins at the axis at some height away from the mouth (over-ventilated case).

Since flame heights are generally large for the exponential terms in the series to be negligible, as a first approximation flame height can be estimated by keeping only the first term of the series. This approximation predicts flame heights for both cases as follows

where

References

Fire
Combustion
Fluid dynamics